Kulaghan, also rendered as Kulaqan, may refer to:
 Kulaghan-e Dartujan
 Kulaghan-e Tuman-e Abdollah
 Kulaghan-e Tuman-e Gholam Hasan